Karavan may refer to:
Karavan, a hard rock band from Pakistan
Karavan (Estonian band), band from Estonia
Karavan (album), an album of Serbian rock band Galija
Karavan, Batken, a village in Batken Region, Kyrgyzstan
the former name of Kerben, Kyrgyzstan, a town in Jalal-Abad Region, Kyrgyzstan
Karevan, a village in Hormozgan Province, Iran